Courtney Woods is a recurring character in British sci-fi series Doctor Who, appearing in Series 8. The character was introduced as a disruptive student to Clara Oswald (Jenna Coleman) before meeting the Twelfth Doctor (Peter Capaldi) and joining him for an adventure. She was portrayed by Ellis George.

Background
According to Courtney’s character profile, she is billed as "She’s cheeky, opinionated and a disruptive influence…" and it was also said "She can be a nightmare and when Clara first joined the school’s teaching staff, Courtney delighted in giving her a hard time. She also picked up on the romance between ‘Miss Oswald’ and Danny Pink, never missing an opportunity to poke fun at Clara about it."

Storylines
On Clara's first day as a teacher, she threatened to kick all of the students out of school. Courtney challenged her threat, replying with, "Go on, do it." Clara was inspired to use the same tactic against the Half-Face Man when he threatened to kill her.

Courtney teased the secretary in the school about her flirtations with Danny.

She once told Clara she couldn't focus on her work because Clara's face was "too wide". Clara related this story to Danny on their first date.

Courtney went to fetch some paper towels from the new caretaker, who was the Doctor being undercover and saw a light coming out of the TARDIS. He initially denied her knowledge, but then showed her the capabilities of his ship. He took her into space. However, the experience was too much for Courtney, who was made sick by it.

According to Clara, at some point the Doctor had told Courtney that the child "wasn't special". This apparently prompted Courtney to increase her disruptive behavior, including stealing the Doctor's psychic paper and using it as a fake ID. Clara implored the Doctor to tell Courtney that she was indeed special. His interpretation of this was to take Courtney and Clara for an adventure on the Moon in 2049, where Courtney would end up being the first woman on it, As it became clear that the Moon was really an egg about to hatch, Courtney strongly advocated for not killing the emerging creature. This led to her and Clara saving Earth from the results of making the wrong choice. The Doctor claimed to Clara that Courtney would eventually "bizarrely" become President of the United States, meeting a man named Blinovitch. This was suggested again in a post-it on Clara's apartment in Dark Water.

Reception
In a review for "Kill The Moon", Carissa Pavlica of TVFanatic.com described Courtney as "a giant pain in the behind."

A reviewer in the Guardian called Ellis George one to watch for her role as Courtney in "The Caretaker". While giving the episode "The Caretaker" a bad review, the reviewer gave praise Ellis George, calling her "a star in the making," and her inclusion in the episode as "great."

References

External links

Recurring characters in Doctor Who
British female characters in television
Fictional Black British people
Television characters introduced in 2014
Teenage characters in television